Zhengzhou Airport Economy Zone, abbreviated as ZAEZ, is an airport-based economy zone developed around Zhengzhou Xinzheng International Airport in Henan, People's Republic of China.

It contains Foxconn Zhengzou Technology park, the largest producer of iPhone for Apple Inc.

History
The history of Zhengzhou Airport Economy Zone dates back to October 2007, when Henan Provincial Party Committee and Henan Provincial People's Government approved its establishment. In 2010, Zhengzhou Xinzheng Comprehensive Bonded Zone was established formally with the approval of the state council. In April 2011, the administrative committee of Zhengzhou Xinzheng Comprehensive Bonded Zone (Zhengzhou Airport Economy Zone) was set up. The current Zhengzhou Airport Economy Zone was approved to be established by the state council on 7 March 2013, making it the first state-level airport-based development area in China.

The local government has invested more than $1.5 billion to Foxconn to build large sections of their factory and nearby employee housing.

In November 2022, the government imposed the lockdown at the Zhengzhou Airport Economy Zone in response to protests against Zero-COVID restrictions at a Foxconn.

Transport
Zhengzhou Hangkonggang railway station

References

Zhengzhou
New areas (China)